The 19th arrondissement of Paris (XIXe arrondissement) is one of the 20 arrondissements of the capital city of France. In spoken French, this arrondissement is referred to as dix-neuvième.

The arrondissement, known as Butte-Chaumont, is situated on the right bank of the River Seine. It is crossed by two canals, the Canal Saint-Denis and the Canal de l'Ourcq, which meet near the Parc de la Villette.

The 19th arrondissement, mixing the Old French bohemianism and also the Parisian cosmopolitanism, includes two public parks: the Parc des Buttes Chaumont, located on a hill, and the Parc de la Villette, which is home to the Cité des Sciences et de l'Industrie, a museum and exhibition centre, the Conservatoire de Paris, one of the most renowned music schools in Europe, the Cabaret Sauvage, the Zénith de Paris and the Philharmonie de Paris, both part of the Cité de la Musique.

Geography
The land area of the arrondissement is 6.786 km2 (2.62 sq. miles).

Demographics
The population of the 19th arrondissement has been constantly increasing since 1975. At the last census, in 2009, the population was 184,787 inhabitants. 68,101 people worked in the arrondissement in 1999.

This sector has become the home for many immigrants to France, particularly from North Africa.

Places of interest
 Parc des Buttes Chaumont
 Parc de la Villette
 Parc de la Butte-du-Chapeau-Rouge
 The Cent Quatre arts centre

References

External links